Danny may also refer to:

 Hurricane Danny (disambiguation), any of several Atlantic hurricanes
 Operation Danny, 1948 Israeli attack on Arab areas in Palestine
 Danny (2014 film), a Canadian documentary film about former Newfoundland and Labrador premier Danny Williams
 Danny (2019 film), a Canadian documentary film about director Aaron Zeghers's uncle, Danny Ryder
 Danny (2020 film), an Indian Tamil-language film
 Danny (TV series), a short-lived CBS sitcom starring Daniel Stern
 "Lonely Blue Boy" (song), originally titled "Danny", a 1960 song from the film King Creole
 "Danny", a song by Tiffany from the album Tiffany
"Danny", a song by C418 from Minecraft – Volume Alpha
 Danny House, an Elizabethan mansion in West Sussex, England